Lindeberg Station is a railway station located at Lindeberg in Sørum, Norway. The station is located on the Trunk Line and was opened in 1944. The station is served by Oslo Commuter Rail trains with hourly services from Dal Station to Oslo Central Station and Drammen Station.

External links
 Jernbaneverket's page on Dal 

Railway stations in Sørum
Railway stations on the Trunk Line
Railway stations opened in 1944
1944 establishments in Norway